Folasaba Chiefdom is a chiefdom in Koinadugu District of Sierra Leone. Its capital is Musaia.

References 

Chiefdoms of Sierra Leone
Northern Province, Sierra Leone